Ehud "Udi" Vaks (born 27 June 1979) is an Israeli judoka.

Vaks won a bronze medal at the 1998 under-20 World Judo Championships in the under 60 kg weight class.

2004 Olympics
In the 2004 Summer Olympics, competing in the half lightweight 66 kg weight class, Vaks was scheduled to fight Iranian competitor Arash Miresmaeili in the first round. Miresmaeili was disqualified from the competition because he was above the allowable weight limit for his class.

It is widely believed that Miresmaili deliberately set out to be disqualified for political reasons, which is supported by his own comments: “Although I have trained for months and was in good shape I refused to fight my Israeli opponent to sympathise with the suffering of the people of Palestine and I do not feel upset at all."

Comments from Iranian officials also supported this view. The Iranian state news agency quoted Iranian President Mohammad Khatami as saying that Miresmaeili's actions would be "recorded in the history of Iranian glories," and that the nation considered him to be "the champion of the 2004 Olympic Games."

Iranian Olympic team chairman Nassrollah Sajadi told the Sharq newspaper that the government should give the athlete a $115,000 bonus for his actions, the same amount it gave to gold medalists.

Miresmaeili's disqualification resulted in Vaks being awarded a bye into the 2nd round. He was defeated by Algerian judoka Amar Meridja.

See also
 Judo at the 2004 Summer Olympics
 List of select Jewish judokas
 List of Israelis
 Arash Miresmaeili#Athens Olympic Games; controversy

References

External links
 
 
 

1979 births
Living people
Israeli male judoka
Olympic judoka of Israel
Judoka at the 2004 Summer Olympics
Jewish martial artists
Israeli Ashkenazi Jews